A Turma do Balão Mágico is the first studio album by Brazilian band Turma do Balão Mágico, released on November 30, 1982, by CBS Records. According to  Veja, the album sold over 600,000 copies in Brazil by January 4, 1984. The songs on the album were written by Edgard Poças.

Track List 
Side A
 Baile Dos Passarinhos
 O Pato Cantor
 A Galinha Magricela
 Tem Gato Na Tuba
 Cowboy Do Amor
 P. R. Você
 Upa! Upa! (Meu Trolinho)
Side B
 Charleston
 A Canção Dos Felisbertos
 Co-co-uá
 Oh! Suzana
 Dança Sim
 O Trenzinho

Credits 
 Turma do Balão Mágico - vocals
 Robson Jorge - guitar
 Nilo Pinta - guitars
 Jamil Joanes - bass
 Lincoln Olivetti - keyboards
 Picolé - drums

Bibliography
Barcinski, André (2014). Pavões Misteriosos — 1974-1983: A explosão da música pop no Brasil. São Paulo: Editora Três Estrelas.

References 

1982 albums
Portuguese-language albums
Sony Music Brazil albums
CBS Records albums